Carlos Moyá defeated Cédric Pioline in the final, 6–3, 6–0, 7–5 to win the singles tennis title at the 1998 Monte Carlo Open.

Marcelo Ríos was the reigning champion, but did not participate this year.

Seeds
The top eight seeds received a bye to the second round.

Draw

Finals

Top half

Section 1

Section 2

Bottom half

Section 3

Section 4

References

External links
 ATP main draw

Singles